Sioux National Forest was a National Forest (NF) established by Executive Order 908 (President Theodore Roosevelt) on July 1, 1908.  The order called for the consolidation of the following national forests and forest units into a single entity: 

 Ekalaka National Forest, Carter County, Montana ,   
 Long Pine National Forest, Carter County, Montana ,   
 Cave Hills National Forest, Harding County, South Dakota,  
 North Cave Hills, Harding County, South Dakota  
 South Cave Hills, Harding County, South Dakota  
 Short Pine National Forest, Harding County, South Dakota, (  
 East Short Pine Hills, Harding County, South Dakota  
 West Short Pine Hills, Harding County, South Dakota  
 Slim Buttes National Forest, Harding County, South Dakota ,   

In addition to these national forests and forest units, a parcel of land completely surrounding the Chalk Buttes mountain range in Carter County, Montana was also included:

 Chalk Buttes, Carter County, Montana ,  

With these eight land units, the Sioux National Forest comprised . 

Upon its inception in 1908, Seth Bullock, the first sheriff of Deadwood, South Dakota, was appointed supervisor of Sioux NF by President Theodore Roosevelt. (In 1900, during the McKinley administration, then-Vice President Roosevelt had appointed Bullock supervisor of the Black Hills Forest Reserve, which later became Black Hills National Forest.]

On January 13, 1920, Sioux NF was absorbed by Custer National Forest. Although the name Sioux was discontinued as a national forest designation, Custer NF created the Sioux District, which comprised the eight land units of the Sioux NF.

In 2014, Custer National Forest merged with Gallatin National Forest to form Custer Gallatin NF. Within this new entity, Custer NF’s Sioux District was replaced by the Custer Gallatin NF Sioux Ranger District, which encompasses the Chalk Buttes, Ekalaka Hills, Long Pines, North Cave Hills, South Cave Hills, East Short Pine Hills, West Short Pine Hills, and Slim Buttes land units.

References

Notes

See also
 List of forests in Montana

Former National Forests of Montana
Former National Forests of South Dakota
Protected areas of Harding County, South Dakota
Protected areas of Carter County, Montana
1908 establishments in Montana